Upojenie (English: Ecstasy) is a 2002 collaboration between singer Anna Maria Jopek and guitarist Pat Metheny, recorded in Warsaw, Poland. It features Jopek's compositions and traditional folk song arrangements, as well as some of Metheny's well-known tracks, such as "Are You Going with Me?" and "Follow Me". Finally, there is "Polskie drogi" ("Polish Paths") – a cover of a main theme for a film series of the same title by Andrzej Kurylewicz.

In 2008 an international edition of the album was released by Nonesuch Records. The running order of the selections is different and three additional songs are included.

Track listing

Tracks 7, 16, and 17 are only on the international edition (2008).

Personnel
 Anna Maria Jopek – vocals, electric piano
 Pat Metheny – guitars, guitar synthesizer, 42-string guitar, synthesizers (tracks 1–5 and 7–14)
 Cezary Konrad – drums (tracks 2, 3, 5, 7, and 9–13)
 Leszek Możdżer – piano (tracks 2, 3, 5, 6, and 9–11)
 Pawel Bzim Zarecki – synthesizers, organ, percussion (tracks 2, 3, 5, 7, 9, and 11–13)
 Darek Oleszkiewicz – double bass (tracks 2 and 9–14)
 Wojciech Kowalewski – percussion (tracks 2, 3, 5, 7, and 13)
 Piotr Nazaruk – flute, recorder, hammered dulcimer, banjo, vocals, percussion (tracks 2, 5, and 7)
 Marcin Pospieszalski –  bass guitar (tracks 3, 5, and 7)
 Henryk Miśkiewicz – soprano saxophone (tracks 8 and 11)
 Mateusz Pospieszalski – synthesizer (tracks 9 and 13)
 Mino Cinelu – percussion (tracks 11 and 13)
 Orchestra conducted by Mateusz Pospieszalski (tracks 9 and 13)
 Bernard Maseli – vibraphone (track 9)
 Marek Napiórkowski – guitar (track 11)
 Barney – alien voices (track 7)

Charts and certifications

Weekly charts

Certifications

References

External links
album description of Anna Maria Jopek's official site
2008 release page
AllAboutJazz review by Marc Sabbatini

Jazz albums by Polish artists
Pat Metheny albums
2002 albums